Milo B. Lory (November 12, 1903 – December 3, 1974) was an American sound editor. He was best known for his work on the film Ben-Hur (1959), which earned him an Academy Award. He was also nominated in the same category for his work on the film Mutiny on the Bounty (1962).

Oscar nominations
Both nominations were in the category of Best Special Effects.

32nd Academy Awards-Ben-Hur, shared with A. Arnold Gillespie and Robert MacDonald. Won.
35th Academy Awards-Nominated for Mutiny on the Bounty. Nomination shared with A. Arnold Gillespie. Lost to The Longest Day.

Filmography
The Grissom Gang (1971)
The Organization (1971)
Too Late the Hero (1970)
Mutiny on the Bounty (1962)
Ben-Hur (1959)
Saddle the Wind (1958)
The Barretts of Wimpole Street (1957)
The Teahouse of the August Moon (1957)
Around the World in 80 Days (1956)
Oklahoma! (1955)
Athena (1954)

References

External links

Best Visual Effects Academy Award winners
American sound editors
1903 births
1974 deaths
People from Indiana